Chaw Su Khin is a Burmese pop singer, known for her powerful voice. As of 2018, she had released 13 solo albums.

Born in Insein Township, Burma, she spent her formative years between Insein and Pinlebu Township, Sagaing Division, as one of four siblings. She began her musical career in the 1970s, earning money performing with her brother at a restaurant in Pinlebu.

She debuted with an album entitled Sunlight's Kiss (နေရောင်ခြည်ရဲ့ အနမ်း). A subsequent album, The Power of Compassion (အကြင်နာအင်အား), released in 2000, was a mainstream commercial success, and propelled her to fame. She held her first solo concert in 2018.

Discography 

 Sunlight's Kiss (နေရောင်ခြည်ရဲ့ အနမ်း)
 The Power of Compassion (အကြင်နာအင်အား) (2000)
 The Day We Meet Again (ပြန်ဆုံမယ့်နေ့) (2020)

Personal life 
Chaw Su Khin is married and has two daughters. Her cousin Kay Kay Moe is also a singer.

References 

Living people
21st-century Burmese women singers
20th-century Burmese women singers
Year of birth missing (living people)